A Troll in Central Park (released in some countries as Stanley's Magic Garden) is a 1994 American animated musical fantasy comedy film co-directed by Don Bluth and Gary Goldman. The film stars the voice talents of Dom DeLuise, Cloris Leachman, Charles Nelson Reilly, Phillip Glasser, Tawny Sunshine Glover, Hayley Mills and Jonathan Pryce. It tells the story of a troll who is exiled from the Kingdom of Trolls by an evil troll queen for growing flowers and lands in Central Park where he befriends two children. This is the final Bluth film to star DeLuise.

Theatrically released in the United States on October 7, 1994, by Warner Bros., the film was panned by critics and grossed $71,368 at the North American box office, becoming a box office failure.

Plot
Stanley is a troll with a magical green thumb, able to bring flowers and plants to life at a touch, which is forbidden in his home, the Kingdom of Trolls. When he is discovered doing so, the other trolls arrest him and take him to Gnorga, the queen of the trolls, who concludes that Stanley "gives a bad name to trolls everywhere" and demands that he be transformed to stone with her dark thumb (which is also purple when it glows). At the behest of her consort King Llort who is constantly attacked by his wife's dog, Queen Gnorga instead banishes Stanley to Central Park in New York City where, after a series of mishaps, he ends up in a cave under the bridge.

The next day in a Manhattan apartment, two young siblings named Gus and Rosie learn that they cannot be taken to Central Park because their father Alan has to go to court for an important case and their mother Hillary has to attend the open house on Park Avenue. While left alone with their nanny Maria, Gus takes Rosie to the park himself. While playing with Gus' toy boat by the river, Rosie chases a butterfly to the bridge where she mistakes Stanley for her own troll doll. Realizing Stanley is a real troll, she follows Stanley into the cave and befriends him.

Gus goes after Rosie, only for his toy boat to be accidentally smashed in the process. After becoming surprised to meet Stanley and his crew of talking flowers, Gus tries to force Rosie to come home with him. Stanley then gets into an argument and struggle with Gus over Rosie which causes her to cry.

At the Kingdom of Trolls, Gnorga enjoys her amusement of Rosie's sadness on her crystal. When she discovers Stanley, she becomes furious. Having also witnessed Gus' frustration towards Rosie and Stanley, she decides to have an advantage and casts an evil spell on him, making Gus cry a gigantic flood of tears to drown Stanley along with his flowers and Rosie. Using his green thumb, Stanley enlarges Gus' toy boat which he repaired, transforming it into a "dream boat" to save the kids, and they escape together.

Determined to suppress Stanley herself, Gnorga sends a tornado to transport her and Llort to Central Park while it destroys the park and everything green on it. Meanwhile, Gus and Rosie wake from their nap and decide to get back home. Gnorga and Llort then pursue the pair, intending to use them to bait Stanley. Gnorga succeeds to kidnap Rosie, but Gus manages to elude her thanks to Llort's incompetence. He returns to the cave in the bridge and tries to persuade Stanley to help him to save his sister. Frightened of the reign of Gnorga, Stanley refuses and claims that his magic is no match for Gnorga's. Gus angrily accuses Stanley of cowardice and tells him that his dreams will never come true if he's too scared to fight for what he believes in.

Gus leaves to face Gnorga himself, with the flowers and animals as his back-up. Arriving at the abandoned building where Gnorga and Llort are waiting for Stanley, Gus finds Rosie in a kennel and frees her, while the flowers tie up Gnorga's dog. Seeing the children escape, Gnorga and Llort chase them out the building, leading to a battle. During the fight, Gnorga transforms Gus into a troll with her dark magic and Rosie falls into a chasm. Stanley appears on Gus' toy boat; now transformed into a flying boat with leaf wings, having saved the uninjured Rosie. Then he steps forward and challenges Gnorga to a thumb-wrestling match. Stanley manages to win, planting roses all around Gnorga's body.

As Stanley, Gus, and Rosie escape and celebrate their victory, Gnorga uses Gus' thumb to transform Stanley to stone. Gus' toy boat transforms back to normal, sending the two kids falling through the open window and into their apartment room, while Stanley (in his statue form) lands on top of the nearby trash can. As Gnorga declares her job done, the last of Stanley's power changes her into a rose bush. Then the tornado reappeared and sucked Gnorga, Llort, and their dog back to the Kingdom of Trolls in defeat, while Gus returns to his human form.

The next morning, Gus, Rosie, and their parents visit Central Park, where Gus and Rosie place the petrified Stanley on a makeshift pedestal. Gus attempts to revive him with his temporarily green thumb and appears to fail. As they prepare to leave, he and Rosie look back to find Stanley gone. Then hearing Stanley's whistle, they see Stanley standing on the tree with his flowers; restored to life. Stanley revives Central Park and covers the whole city in vegetation and flowers.

Back in the Kingdom of Trolls, the powerless Gnorga is dethroned and planted, and Llort is welcomed as a much kinder ruler where he reads the newspapers describing his wife as the "queen of posies". He laughs about her humiliation, right before he gets attacked by Gnorga's dog just as the screen blacks out and the credits roll.

Cast
 Dom DeLuise as Stanley, a troll with a magical green thumb that can grow plants.
 Cloris Leachman as Gnorga, the evil Queen of the Trolls who can turn anything to stone with her thumb.
 Charles Nelson Reilly as Llort, the king consort of Queen Gnorga.
 Phillip Glasser as Gus, a boy who befriends Stanley.
 Tawny Sunshine Glover as Rosie, the sister of Gus who befriends Stanley.
 Jonathan Pryce as Alan, the father of Gus and Rosie who works as a lawyer.
 Hayley Mills as Hillary, the mother of Gus and Rosie.
 Neil Ross as Generic Pansy, a talking pansy.
 Will Ryan as:
 Plant Boss, a talking plant that is in charge of the other talking plants.
 A troll guard
 Pat Musick as Snuffy, a talking flower.

Production
Production on the film began in 1990, following the near completion of Rock-a-Doodle. Buddy Hackett and Robert Morley were originally considered for the roles of Stanley and King Llort respectively, but were eventually replaced by Dom DeLuise and Charles Nelson Reilly. Even though the film was completed in 1992, it was not released in theaters until 1994. At that time, the film was originally slated for a March 1994 release, but due to production difficulties and Merlin Films and Media Assets, co-financers of the film, deciding to release Thumbelina first, the film's release date was changed to October 7, 1994.

Soundtrack

The music for A Troll in Central Park was composed and conducted by Robert Folk, who previously provided the soundtrack for Rock-a-Doodle (1991), and was performed by the Irish Film Orchestra. Although a commercial soundtrack was not released alongside the film in 1994, a limited edition CD containing 15 tracks from the movie was made available on February 12, 2012, by Intrada Records as part of their Intrada Special Collection. The tracks were taken from the original digital session masters, with three songs written by Barry Mann, Cynthia Weil, Norman Gimbel and Robert Folk ultimately omitted due to being permanently wedded to sound effects and dialogue from the film.

Reception

Box office
The film grossed $71,368 in North America. It was Don Bluth's lowest-grossing film to date, though not the film to lose him the most money overall. Gary Goldman said the reason for this was that the film was released without any promotion and its release was limited. He also stated that distributor Warner Bros. Pictures did not have any confidence in the film.

Critical reception
A Troll in Central Park holds an approval rating of 14% with an average of 3.48 out of 10 based on seven reviews from Rotten Tomatoes. TV Guide gave the film two out of five stars and felt that the film's appeal was very age-limited, calling it "pastel-pretty and cloyingly sweet" and that "A Troll in Central Park is strictly for the youngest members of the moviegoing audience". The A.V. Club wrote that A Troll in Central Park is "widely considered to be [Don Bluth's] worst film".

Bluth has distanced himself from the film, stating in the July 2001 issue of his magazine ToonTalk that "the development of a story is like the development of a child in a womb; it takes time and it must be done right, and building A Troll in Central Park taught us this lesson, the hard way".

Home media
On January 10, 1995, Warner Home Video released A Troll in Central Park on VHS and LaserDisc in the United States and Canada. In the UK, the film was released on VHS under the title Stanley's Magic Garden. 20th Century Fox Home Entertainment  released the film on DVD for the first time on February 19, 2002.

See also
 List of Warner Bros. theatrical animated features
 List of American films of 1994

References

Note

External links

 
 
 
 
 

1990s American animated films
1990s children's animated films
1990s children's comedy films
1990s English-language films
1990s fantasy adventure films
1990s fantasy comedy films
1990s musical comedy films
1990s musical films
1994 animated films
1994 comedy films
1994 films
American children's animated adventure films
American children's animated comedy films
American children's animated fantasy films
American children's animated musical films
American fantasy adventure films
American fantasy comedy films
Animated films based on Norse mythology
Animated films set in Manhattan
Central Park
Environmental films
Films about trolls
Films directed by Don Bluth
Films directed by Gary Goldman
Films produced by Don Bluth and Gary Goldman
Films produced by John Pomeroy
Films scored by Robert Folk
Films with screenplays by Don Bluth
Films with screenplays by Gary Goldman
Films with screenplays by John Pomeroy
Sullivan Bluth Studios films
Warner Bros. films
Warner Bros. animated films